This is a list of managers of Portsmouth F.C.

Managers
Figures correct as of 18 March 2023
Includes all competitive matches.

Caretaker managers
Figures correct as of 20 January 2023
Includes all competitive matches.

References

Managers
 
Portsmouth